Gai-Luron is a French comics series about a melancholic basset hound, Gai-Luron, created on July 12, 1964, by Gotlib. Originally published in the Franco-Belgian comics magazines Vaillant and Pif Gadget, the character joined Nanar, Jujube et Piette, which Gotlib had drawn since 1962, but eventually headlined a hit series of its own. The album collection series started in 1975, and the second album, Gai-Luron en écrase méchamment was awarded the prize for French comical work at the Angoulême in 1976.

Synopsis
It follows the anthropomorphic dog Gai-Luron (whose name can be roughly translated as "Jolly Fellow", which contrasts with Gai-Luron's generally apathetic behaviour), his girlfriend Belle-Lurette and his friend Jujube the fox.

The plot sometimes involves Gai-Luron and Jujube reading their fan mail, which is almost always written by the same reader, a little boy named Jean-Pierre Liégeois, or else a friend or relative of his.

Bibliography
Gai-Luron's adventures were published in 10 volumes between 1975 and 1982, and a last one, La bataille navale...ou Gai-Luron en slip, was published as Gotlib's goodbye to the comic strip scene in 1986.

Gai-Luron, collection Les Rois du rire n°10 (1969, Éditions Vaillant)
 1 : Gai-Luron ou la joie de vivre (1975, Audie)
 2 : Gai-Luron en écrase méchamment (1975, Audie)
 3 : Gai-Luron rit de se voir beau en ce miroir (1976, Audie)
 4 : Gai-Luron et Jean-Pierre Liegeois  (1976, Audie)
 5 : Gai-Luron fait rien qu'à copier (1977, Audie)
 6 : Gai-Luron ce héros au sourire si doux (1978, Audie)
 7 : Gai-Luron s'en tire par une pirouette (1979, Audie)
 8 : Gai-Luron drague comme une bête  (1980, Audie)
 9 : Gai-Luron n'engendre pas la mélancolie ! (1981, Audie)
 10 : Gai-Luron tire une tronche pas possible (1982, Audie)
La bataille navale ou Gai-Luron en slip (1986, Audie)

References

 Gai-Luron publications in Vaillant and Pif, and Fluide Glacial BDoubliées 
 Gai Luron albums Bedetheque 
 
Footnotes

External links
 Gotlib official site

French comic strips
Comics about dogs
Anthropomorphic dogs
1964 comics debuts
1986 comics endings
Comics characters introduced in 1964
Humor comics
Metafictional comics
Surreal comedy
French comics characters
Male characters in comics